Musonda is a surname.

This is a list of people with this surname:

 Charles Musonda (born 22 August 1969), a Zambian former professional footballer
 Charly Musonda (born 1996), Belgian footballer
 Christopher Musonda (born January 24, 1986), a Zambian football player who is currently a free agent.
 Fewdays Musonda, a Zambian football manager. Former manager of CAPS United F.C. and Masvingo United F.C.
 Frankie Musonda (born 12 December 1997), an English professional footballer
 Jean Collins Musonda Kalusambo,  a member of the African Union's Economic, Social and Cultural Council representing Central Africa
 Joseph Musonda (born 30 May 1977 in Kalulushi), a Zambian football defender
 Lamisha Musonda (born 27 March 1992), a Belgian footballer of Zambian descent
 Lydia Musonda Kasangala (born 6 May 1988), a Congolese handball player
 Lubambo Musonda (born 1 March 1995), a Zambian international footballer who plays for the Armenian club Gandzasar Kapan
 Monica Musonda (born ), a Zambian businesswoman, lawyer and entrepreneur
 Trevor Selwyn Musonda Mwamba a Botswana Anglican bishop

It could also refer to the Musonda Falls in Zambia
Zambian surnames